The men's pursuit competition of the Biathlon World Championships 2012 was held on March 4, 2012 at 13:15 local time.

Results 
The race started at 13:15.

References

Biathlon World Championships 2012